Cora arachnoidea is a species of basidiolichen in the family Hygrophoraceae. Found in Venezuela, it was formally described as a new species in 2013 by Jesús Hernández and Robert Lücking. The specific epithet makes reference to the arachnoid (cobwebby) texture of the thallus surface. Another member of the genus with a similar surface is Cora hirsuta.

Cora arachnoidea is widely distributed in the northern Andes (including Colombia, Venezuela, and Bolivia) and the Cordilleras of Costa Rica. It grows on the soil amongst páramo vegetation, often in association with bryophytes.

References

arachnoidea
Lichen species
Lichens described in 2013
Lichens of Central America
Lichens of South America
Taxa named by Robert Lücking
Basidiolichens